Formamide is an amide derived from formic acid. It is a colorless liquid which is miscible with water and has an ammonia-like odor. It is chemical feedstock for the manufacture of sulfa drugs and other pharmaceuticals, herbicides and pesticides, and in the manufacture of hydrocyanic acid.  It has been used as a softener for paper and fiber. It is a solvent for many ionic compounds. It has also been used as a solvent for resins and plasticizers. Some astrobiologists suggest that it may be an alternative to water as the main solvent in other forms of life.

Formamides are compounds of the type RR′NCHO. One important formamide is dimethylformamide, (CH3)2NCHO.

Production

Historical production
In the past, formamide was produced by treating formic acid with ammonia, which produces ammonium formate, which in turn yields formamide upon heating:
 HCOOH + NH3 → 
  → HCONH2 + H2O

Formamide is also generated by aminolysis of ethyl formate:
HCOOCH2CH3 + NH3 → HCONH2 + CH3CH2OH

Modern production
The current industrial process for the manufacture of formamide involves the carbonylation of ammonia:
CO  +  NH3   →   HCONH2

An alternative two-stage process involves the ammonolysis of methyl formate, which is formed from carbon monoxide and methanol:
CO + CH3OH → HCOOCH3
HCO2CH3  +  NH3   →   HCONH2  +  CH3OH

Applications
Formamide is used in the industrial production of hydrogen cyanide.  It is also used as a solvent for processing various polymers such as polyacrylonitrile.

Reactions
Formamide decomposes into carbon monoxide and ammonia at 180 °C.
HCONH2 → CO + NH3
Traces of hydrogen cyanide (HCN) and water are also observed.

In the presence of solid acid catalysts, formamide dehydrates to HCN:
HC(O)NH2 → HCN + H2O

Niche or laboratory applications
Formamide is a constituent of cryoprotectant vitrification mixtures used for cryopreservation of tissues and organs.

Formamide is also used as an RNA stabiliser in gel electrophoresis by deionizing RNA. In capillary electrophoresis, it is used for stabilizing (single) strands of denatured DNA.

Another use is to add it in sol-gel solutions in order to avoid cracking during sintering.

Formamide, in its pure state, has been used as an alternative solvent for the electrostatic self-assembly of polymer nanofilms.

Formamide is used to prepare primary amines directly from ketones via their N-formyl derivatives, using the Leuckart reaction.

Biochemistry
Formamides are intermediates in the methanogenesis cycle.

Prebiotic chemistry

Formamide has been proposed as an alternative solvent to water, perhaps with the ability to support life with alternative biochemistries to that currently found on Earth.  It forms by the hydrolysis of hydrogen cyanide. With a large dipole moment, its solvation properties are similar to those of water.

Formamide has been shown to convert to traces of guanine upon heating in the presence of ultraviolet light.

Safety
Like all organic compounds, contact with skin and eyes is not recommended. With an LD50 of grams per kg, formamide is of low acute toxicity. It also has low mutagenicity.

Formamide is classified as toxic to reproductive health.

References

 
Amide solvents